Sweet Melancholy or Soft Melancholy is a painting of 1756 by Joseph-Marie Vien in the Cleveland Museum of Art.

It is recorded in the cabinet of chevalier de Damery, a military officer and collector of prints, drawings and paintings, who after financial ruin had to sell his collection, ending his life in Les Invalides.

Description 
This painting centered on sentiment, which was part of the cabinet of the Chevalier de Damery, calls into question the predominance of historical painting, a noble genre par excellence. Although belonging to Antiquity, the young woman represents less a bygone historical era than a solitary character in the grip of the pain of love. This work constitutes a turning point in French painting of the 1750s, almost illustrating the qualities of "noble simplicity" and "quiet grandeur" in classical art recommended by Winckelmann, the previous year, in his Reflections on the imitation of Greek works in painting and sculpture.

The extroverted movements of the previous canvases have given way to the silent introspection of the academic tradition illustrated by Poussin’s Agrippina from The Death of Germanicus. This painting had an impact on David, then a pupil of Vien, which was felt in his later work4. Nearly three decades later, in the 1780s, David revived his master's attempts to offer a new mode of pictorial and emotive representation in a simple style by putting female figures in antique togas arranging garlands of flowers on ancient busts, offering doves to Venus or burning incense, according to codes inspired by new archaeological scholarship, often inspired by recent excavations at Pompeii and Herculaneum, to substitute a vision of heroism and virile sacrifice.

References

Paintings by Joseph-Marie Vien
Paintings in the collection of the Cleveland Museum of Art
1756 paintings
Birds in art